Juan Manuel Blanes Municipal Museum of the Arts is a museum in Prado, Montevideo, Uruguay.

Location and history

The Juan Manuel Blanes Municipal Museum of the Arts is located at Avenida Millan 4015, in the neighbourhood of Prado, Montevideo, in a Palladian villa designated a National Heritage Site in 1975. The villa was originally designed in 1870 by Juan Alberto Capurro, an engineer trained at the Turin Polytechnic, for the then-owner Dr. Juan Battista Raffo. The surrounding garden reveals elements of French landscape design. The municipality acquired the villa in 1929, when it commissioned the architect Eugenio Baroffio to renovate and expand the building. Baroffio maintained the eclecticism of the original design, leaving the facade intact. The museum was founded in 1930, coinciding with the 100th anniversary of the first Constitution of Uruguay, and named after the patriotic Uruguayan artist, Juan Manuel Blanes.

Park and gardens
This property has a big park full of ancient trees, on the shore of the Miguelete Creek.

Behind the museum can be found the Japanese Garden.

Collections
The museum displays Uruguayan art ranging from the nation's founding to the present day, including the works of Juan Manuel Blanes, Pedro Figari, Rafael Barradas, José Cúneo, and Carlos González.

Hours and operation
The museum is open from noon to 5:45 p.m. every day from Tuesday through Sunday. It does not charge admission.

See also 
 List of museums in Uruguay
Parque Prado

References

External links
Official website

Art museums established in 1930
Museums in Montevideo
Art museums and galleries in Uruguay
1930 establishments in Uruguay
Prado, Montevideo